The 2018–19 season was Norwich City's third consecutive season in the Championship. During the season they participated in the Championship, FA Cup and EFL Cup.

The season covered the period from 1 July 2018 to 30 June 2019.

Transfers

Transfers in

Transfers out

Loans in

Loans out

Pre-season friendlies
On 16 May 2018, SC Paderborn announced a pre-season friendly with Norwich City was to take place on 15 July. The club themselves confirmed the SC Paderborn friendly on 17 May, whilst also announcing a friendly with Union Berlin. Other friendly opponents include King's Lynn Town, Lincoln City, Crawley Town, Luton Town and Charlton Athletic.

Competitions

Overview

Championship

League table

Results summary

Results by matchday

Matches
On 21 June 2018, the league fixtures were announced.

FA Cup

The third round draw was made live on BBC by Ruud Gullit and Paul Ince from Stamford Bridge on 3 December 2018.

EFL Cup

On 15 June 2018, the draw for the first round was made in Vietnam. The second round draw was made from the Stadium of Light on 16 August. The third round draw was made on 30 August 2018 by David Seaman and Joleon Lescott. The fourth round draw was made live on Quest by Rachel Yankey and Rachel Riley on 29 September.

Statistics

Appearances, goals and cards

Goalscorers

References

Norwich City F.C. seasons
Norwich City